Jean-Claude Van Cauwenberghe (born 28 April 1944 in Charleroi), nicknamed "Van Cau", is a Belgian politician. He is member of the Parti Socialiste (Socialist Party; PS). He was the tenth Minister-President of Wallonia from 4 April 2000 until 30 September 2005. He resigned amid the ICDI affair and was replaced by Elio Di Rupo. He also served as mayor of Charleroi (1983-2000).

Notes

1944 births
Living people
Belgian socialists
Members of the Parliament of the French Community
Members of the Parliament of Wallonia
Ministers-President of Wallonia
Socialist Party (Belgium) politicians
Walloon movement activists
21st-century Belgian politicians